Astrid Danielsen (born 1 November 1968) is a Norwegian cyclist. She was born in Trondheim. She competed in the women's individual road race at the 1988 Summer Olympics.

References

External links
 

 

1968 births
Living people
Sportspeople from Trondheim
Norwegian female cyclists
Olympic cyclists of Norway
Cyclists at the 1988 Summer Olympics